Nemamyxine elongata, the bootlace hagfish, is a species of hagfish in the genus Nemamyxine. Distribution, abundance, and natural history are not known. Only two specimens have been collected. One, dead, was found in a net in the Kaituna River (Bay of Plenty), and thought to have been a fishery discard. The other was collected alive during a trawl at 132-140m in the Canterbury Bight (East coast of South Island). The larger specimen was 867 mm TL but maximum size is unknown. One specimen was a female with small eggs similar to those of other hagfish species..

References

Myxinidae
Marine fish of New Zealand
Taxa named by Laurence R. Richardson
Fish described in 1958